Organisms that live freely at the ocean surface, termed neuston, include keystone organisms like the golden seaweed Sargassum that makes up the Sargasso Sea, floating barnacles, marine snails, nudibranchs, and cnidarians. Many ecologically and economically important fish species live as or rely upon neuston. Species at the surface are not distributed uniformly; the ocean's surface harbours unique neustonic communities and ecoregions found at only certain latitudes and only in specific ocean basins. But the surface is also on the front line of climate change and pollution. Life on the ocean's surface connects worlds. From shallow waters to the deep sea, the open ocean to rivers and lakes, numerous terrestrial and marine species depend on the surface ecosystem and the organisms found there.

The ocean's surface acts like a skin between the atmosphere above and the water below, and harbours an ecosystem unique to this environment. This sun-drenched habitat can be defined as roughly one metre in depth, as nearly half of UV-B is attenuated within this first meter. Organisms here must contend with wave action and unique chemical and physical properties. The surface is utilised by a wide range of species, from various fish and cetaceans, to species that ride on ocean debris (termed rafters).

Most prominently, the surface is home to a unique community of free-living organisms, termed neuston (from the Greek word υεω, which means both to swim and to float). Floating organisms are also sometimes referred to as pleuston, though neuston is more commonly used. Despite the diversity and importance of the ocean's surface in connecting disparate habitats, and the risks it faces, not a lot is known about neustonic life.

Overview
Neuston are key ecological links connecting ecosystems as far ranging as coral reefs, islands, the deep sea, and even freshwater habitats. In the North Pacific, 80% of the loggerhead turtle diet consists of neuston prey, and nearly 30% of the Laysan albatross's diet is neuston. Diverse pelagic and reef fish species live at the surface when young, including commercially important fish species like the Atlantic cod, salmon, and billfish. Neuston can be concentrated as living islands that completely obscure the sea surface, or scattered into sparse meadows over thousands of miles. Yet the role of the neuston, and in many cases their mere existence, is often overlooked.

One of the most well-known surface ecoregions is the Sargasso Sea, an ecologically distinct region packed with thick, neustonic brown seaweed in the North Atlantic. Multiple ecologically and commercially important species depend on the Sargasso Sea, but neustonic life exists in every ocean basin and may serve a similar, if unrecognised, role in regions across the planet. For example, over 50 years ago, USSR scientist A. I. Savilov characterised 7 neustonic ecoregions in the Pacific Ocean. Each ecoregion possesses a unique combination of biotic and abiotic conditions and hosts a unique community of neustonic organisms. Yet these ecoregions have been largely forgotten.

But there is another reason to study neuston: The ocean's surface is on the front line of human impacts, from climate change to pollution, oil spills to plastic. The ocean's surface is hit hard by anthropogenic change, and the surface ecosystem is likely already dramatically different from even a few hundred years ago. For example, prior to widespread damming, logging, and industrialisation, more wood may have entered the open ocean, while plastic had not yet been invented. And because floating life provides food and shelter for diverse species, changes in the surface habitat will cause changes in other ecosystems and have implications that are not currently fully understand or be able to be predicted.

Ocean surface life (neuston)

Invoking images of the open ocean's surface, the imagination can conjure up an endless empty space. A flat line parting the blue below from the blue above. But in reality a diverse array of species occupy this unique boundary layer. A tangle of terms exist for different organisms occupying different niches of the ocean's surface. The most inclusive term, neuston, is used here to refer to all of them.

Neustonic animals and plants live hanging from the surface of the ocean as if suspended from the roof of a massive cave, and are incapable of controlling their direction of movement. They are considered permanent residents of the surface layer. Many genera are globally distributed. Many organisms have morphological features that enable them to remain at the ocean's surface, with the most noticeable adaptations being floats.

Floaters (pleuston)

Epineuston

Hyponeuston

Rafting organisms

Surface microlayer

The sea surface microlayer (SML) is the boundary interface between the atmosphere and ocean, covering about 70% of the Earth's surface. With an operationally defined thickness between 1 and 1000 µm, the SML has physicochemical and biological properties that are measurably distinct from underlying waters. Recent studies now indicate that the SML covers the ocean to a significant extent, and evidence shows that it is an aggregate-enriched biofilm environment with distinct microbial communities. Because of its unique position at the air-sea interface, the SML is central to a range of global biogeochemical and climate-related processes.

The sea surface microlayer (SML) is the boundary interface between the atmosphere and ocean, covering about 70% of the Earth's surface. The SML has physicochemical and biological properties that are measurably distinct from underlying waters. Because of its unique position at the air-sea interface, the SML is central to a range of global biogeochemical and climate-related processes. Although known for the last six decades, the SML often has remained in a distinct research niche, primarily as it was not thought to exist under typical oceanic conditions. Recent studies now indicate that the SML covers the ocean to a significant extent, highlighting its global relevance as the boundary layer linking two major components of the Earth system – the ocean and the atmosphere.

In 1983, Sieburth hypothesised that the SML was a hydrated gel-like layer formed by a complex mixture of carbohydrates, proteins, and lipids. In recent years, his hypothesis has been confirmed, and scientific evidence indicates that the SML is an aggregate-enriched biofilm environment with distinct microbial communities. In 1999 Ellison et al. estimated that 200 Tg C yr−1 accumulates in the SML, similar to sedimentation rates of carbon to the ocean's seabed, though the accumulated carbon in the SML probably has a very short residence time. Although the total volume of the microlayer is very small compared to the ocean's volume, Carlson suggested in his seminal 1993 paper that unique interfacial reactions may occur in the SML that may not occur in the underlying water or at a much slower rate there. He therefore hypothesised that the SML plays an important role in the diagenesis of carbon in the upper ocean. Biofilm-like properties and highest possible exposure to solar radiation leads to an intuitive assumption that the SML is a biochemical microreactor.

Historically, the SML has been summarized as being a microhabitat composed of several layers distinguished by their ecological, chemical and physical properties with an operational total thickness of between 1 and 1000 µm. In 2005 Hunter defined the SML as a "microscopic portion of the surface ocean which is in contact with the atmosphere and which may have physical, chemical or biological properties that are measurably different from those of adjacent sub-surface waters". He avoids a definite range of thickness as it depends strongly on the feature of interest. A thickness of 60 µm has been measured based on sudden changes of the pH, and could be meaningfully used for studying the physicochemical properties of the SML. At such thickness, the SML represents a laminar layer, free of turbulence, and greatly affecting the exchange of gases between the ocean and atmosphere. As a habitat for neuston (surface-dwelling organisms ranging from bacteria to larger siphonophores), the thickness of the SML in some ways depends on the organism or ecological feature of interest. In 2005, Zaitsev described the SML and associated near-surface layer (down to 5 cm) as an incubator or nursery for eggs and larvae for a wide range of aquatic organisms.

Hunter's definition includes all interlinked layers from the laminar layer to the nursery without explicit reference to defined depths. In 2017, Wurl er al. proposed Hunter's definition be validated with a redeveloped SML paradigm that includes its global presence, biofilm-like properties and role as a nursery. The new paradigm pushes the SML into a new and wider context relevant to many ocean and climate sciences.

According to Wurl et al.m the SML can never be devoid of organics due to the abundance of surface-active substances (e.g., surfactants) in the upper ocean and the phenomenon of surface tension at air-liquid interfaces. The SML is analogous to the thermal boundary layer, and remote sensing of the sea surface temperature shows ubiquitous anomalies between the sea surface skin and bulk temperature. Even so the differences in both are driven by different processes. Enrichment, defined as concentration ratios of an analyte in the SML to the underlying bulk water, has been used for decades as evidence for the existence of the SML. Consequently, depletions of organics in the SML are debatable; however, the question of enrichment or depletion is likely to be a function of the thickness of the SML (which varies with sea state; including losses via sea spray, the concentrations of organics in the bulk water, and the limitations of sampling techniques to collect thin layers . Enrichment of surfactants, and changes in the sea surface temperature and salinity, serve as universal indicators for the presence of the SML. Organisms are perhaps less suitable as indicators of the SML because they can actively avoid the SML and/or the harsh conditions in the SML may reduce their populations. However, the thickness of the SML remains "operational" in field experiments because the thickness of the collected layer is governed by the sampling method. Advances in SML sampling technology are needed to improve our understanding of how the SML influences air-sea interactions.

Surface slicks

Slicks are meandering lines of smooth water on the ocean surface that are ubiquitous coastal features around the world. A variety of mechanisms can cause slick formation, including tidal and headland fronts, and as a consequence of subsurface waves called internal waves. Internal wave slicks are generated when internal waves interact with steep seafloor topography and drive areas of convergence and divergence at the ocean surface. The build-up of organic material (surfactants) at the surface modifies surface tension causing a smooth, oil slick-like appearance. The convergent flow can accumulate dense aggregations of plankton including larval fish and invertebrates at or below the ocean surface.

Surface slicks are the focal point for numerous trophic and larval connections that are foundational for marine ecosystem function. Life for many marine organisms begins near the ocean surface. Buoyant eggs hatch into planktonic larvae that develop and disperse in the ocean for weeks to months before transitioning into juveniles and eventually finding suitable adult habitat. The pelagic larval stage connects populations and serves as a source of new adults. Oceanic processes affecting the fate of larvae have profound impacts on population replenishment, connectivity, and ecosystem structure. Although it is an important life stage, there is, as of 2021, limited knowledge of the ecology and behaviour of larvae. Understanding the biophysical interactions that govern larval fish survival and transport is essential for predicting and managing marine ecosystems, as well as the fisheries they support.

The diagram shows: (1) Larval and juvenile stages of fishes from many ocean habitats aggregate in slicks in order to capitalize on dense concentrations of prey (2, phytoplankton, 3, zooplankton, 4, larval invertebrates, 5, eggs, and 6, insects). The increased predator–prey overlap in slicks increases energy flow that propagates up the food-web (dotted blue lines show trophic links), enhancing energy available to higher trophic level predators (icons outlined in blue) including humans. More than 100 species of fishes develop and grow in surface slick nurseries before transitioning to adults (solid white lines radiating outward) in Coral Reefs (7–12), Epipelagic (13–15), and Deep-water (16–17) ocean habitats. As adults these taxa (icons outlined in white) play important ecological functions and provide fisheries resources to local human populations. For example, coastal schooling fishes (7, mackerel scad) are important food and bait fish for humans. Planktivorous fish (8, some damselfishes and triggerfishes) transfer energy from zooplankton up to reef predators like jacks (9), which provide top-down control of reefs and are important targets for shoreline recreational fisherfolk. Grazers (10, chubs) help keep coral reefs from being overgrown by macroalgae. Cryptobenthic fishes such as blennies (11) and benthic macrocrustaceans (12, shrimp, stomatopods, crabs) comprise most of the consumed biomass on reefs. In the pelagic ocean, flyingfishes (13) channel energy and nutrients from zooplankton to pelagic predators such as mahi-mahi (14) and billfish (15), both of which utilize slicks as nursery habitat. Larvae of mesopelagic fishes like lanternfish (16) and bathydemersal tripod fishes (17) utilize these surface hotspots before descending to deep-water adult habitat.

The distribution of prey and predators in the ocean is patchy. Larval survival depends on prey availability, predation, and transport to suitable habitat, all of which are influenced by ocean conditions. Ocean processes that drive convergent flow such as fronts, internal waves, and eddies, can structure plankton, enhance overlap of predators and prey, and influence larval dispersal. Convergent features can also lead to a cascade of effects that ultimately drive food web structure and increase ecosystem productivity.

Life history

Life histories connect disparate ecosystems; species that live at the surface during one life history stage may occupy the deep sea, benthos, reefs, or freshwater ecosystems during another. A diversity of fish species utilize the ocean's surface, either as adults or as nursery habitat for eggs and young. In contrast, species floating on the ocean's surface during one life cycle stage often (though not always) have pelagic larval stages. Velella and Porpita release jellyfish (medusae), and while little is known about Porpita medusae, Velella medusae could possibly sink into deeper water, or remain near the surface, where they derive nutrients from zooxanthellae. Janthina have pelagic veliger larvae, and Physalia may release reproductive clusters that drift in the water column. Halobates lay eggs on a variety of objects, including floating objects and pelagic snail shells.

All species with pelagic stages must eventually find their way back to the surface. For Velella and Porpita, larvae generated by sexual reproduction of medusae develop small floats, which carry them to the surface. For the larvae of Janthina, the transition to surface life includes the degradation of their eyes and vestibule system, and at the same time, the production of an external structure, which has been reported as either a small parachute made of mucus, or a cluster of bubbles, which they ride to the surface. Young Halobates may hatch either above or below the surface, and for those below, the surface tension proves a formidable barrier. It may take Halobates nymphs several hours to break through the surface film. Despite the challenges of reaching the surface, there may be benefits to a temporary pelagic life.

Connectivity of ocean surface ecosystems may be facilitated by the life history of species living there. One hypothesis is that species have pelagic stages to "escape" surface sink regions and repopulate surface source regions, where one life cycle stage drifts on surface currents in one direction, and a pelagic stage either remains geographically localised or drifts in the opposite direction. However, some surface species, such as the endemic species of the Sargasso Sea, may remain geographically isolated throughout their life history. While these hypotheses are intriguing, it is not known if or how life history shapes population/species distribution for most neustonic species. Understanding how life history varies by species is a critical component of assessing both connectivity and conservation of neustonic ecosystems.

Sea spray

A stream of airborne microorganisms circles the planet above weather systems but below commercial air lanes. Some peripatetic microorganisms are swept up from terrestrial dust storms, but most originate from marine microorganisms in sea spray. In 2018, scientists reported that hundreds of millions of viruses and tens of millions of bacteria are deposited daily on every square meter around the planet.

These airborne microorganisms form part of the aeroplankton. The aeroplankton are tiny lifeforms that float and drift in the air, carried by the current of the wind; they are the atmospheric analogue to oceanic plankton. Most of the living things that make up aeroplankton are very small to microscopic in size, and many can be difficult to identify because of their tiny size. Scientists collect them for study in traps and sweep nets from aircraft, kites or balloons.

The environmental role of airborne cyanobacteria and microalgae is only partly understood. While present in the air, cyanobacteria and microalgae can contribute to ice nucleation and cloud droplet formation. Cyanobacteria and microalgae can also impact human health. Depending on their size, airborne cyanobacteria and microalgae can be inhaled by humans and settle in different parts of the respiratory system, leading to the formation or intensification of numerous diseases and ailments, e.g., allergies, dermatitis, and rhinitis.

See also
 Marine larval ecology
 Ocean surface topography
 Surface layer
 Sea spray
 Sea air
 Surface Ocean Lower Atmosphere Study
 Joint Global Ocean Flux Study
 Regional Ocean Modeling System

References

Aquatic organisms